Wurst is a compilation album by KMFDM. It was released on September 28, 2010. It contains mixes and edits of new and classic KMFDM tracks. The album was also released as the first disc of a double-disc compilation called Greatest Shit.

Track listing

References

External links
KMFDM at Metropolis Records

KMFDM compilation albums
2010 compilation albums
Metropolis Records remix albums